Korea Patrol (working title Korean Patrol) is a 1951 American war film directed by Max Nosseck and starring Richard Emory and Benson Fong. It was released by Eagle-Lion Films. Together with Sam Fuller’s The Steel Helmet and Sam Katzman’s A Yank in Korea, it was one of the first Hollywood films exploiting the Korean War. The film's sets were designed by the art director Fred Preble.

Plot
When notified of the North Korean invasion of South Korea, an American officer assigned to the Republic of Korea Army leads a mixed American and South Korean six man patrol to blow up a strategic bridge to delay the enemy's advance.

Cast
 Richard Emory as Lt. Craig
Sung Li as Ching, So. Korean runner
 Benson Fong as Kim, So. Korean scout
 Al Eben as 	Sgt. Abrams
 Wong Artarne as 	'Murphy', So. Korean scout
 Danny Davenport as 	Cpl. Dykes
 Harold Fong as	Lee, So. Korean scout
 Richard Barron as 	Maj. Wald
 John Close as 	Headquarter Captain
 Teri Duna as Korean Village Young Woman

Notes

External links 
 

1951 films
Eagle-Lion Films films
Korean War films
American black-and-white films
Films directed by Max Nosseck
American war drama films
1950s war drama films
1950s English-language films
1950s American films